HMS Devonshire was a 66-gun third rate ship of the line of the Royal Navy, built to the dimensions laid out in the 1741 proposals of the 1719 Establishment at Woolwich Dockyard, and launched on 19 July 1745.

Devonshire served until 1772, when she was broken up.

Notes

References

Lavery, Brian (2003) The Ship of the Line – Volume 1: The development of the battlefleet 1650–1850. Conway Maritime Press. .

External links
 

Ships of the line of the Royal Navy
1745 ships